Purna Kumar Sherma Limbu is a Nepalese politician, belonging to the Nepali Congress. In 2005, Sherma was nominated to the Central Working Committee of the Nepali Congress.

In the 2008 Constituent Assembly election he was elected from the Panchthar-1 constituency, winning 12920 votes.

References

Living people
Nepali Congress politicians from Koshi Province
Year of birth missing (living people)

Members of the 1st Nepalese Constituent Assembly